Cross Technological Enterprises (often referred to as Cross Tech or C.T.E.) is a fictional corporation appearing in American comic books published by Marvel Comics. First appearing in Marvel Premiere #47, it is portrayed as being one of the leading technological companies along with Stark Industries and Oscorp.

Publication history
Cross Technological Enterprises first appeared in Marvel Premiere #47-48 (1979).

Fictional history
Self-made man Darren Agonistes Cross created and headed his company Cross Technological Enterprises and made it a success to rival the top competitors. However, Darren was diagnosed with a rare heart condition. He used his own technology to create an experimental nucleorganic pacemaker to save his life. Although a success, the nucleorganic pacemaker mutated Darren's body to and gave him superhuman abilities. A side-effect of the mutation was that Darren would quickly overuse and burn out his heart. Multiple heart transplants were performed, but each heart was removed when overused. Desperate, he kidnapped heart surgeon Doctor Erica Sondheim to replace his damaged heart. He also kidnapped 'donors' from slums. Ant-Man, also looking for Doctor Sondheim to save the life of his daughter Cassie, attempted to rescue her. A battle between Darren and Ant-Man resulted in Darren burning out his heart and dying, Sondheim revealing when Ant-Man interrupted the operation she replaced his old heart rather than a new one. The company was then taken over by Darren's son, Augustine.

A number of burglaries had occurred at C.T.E., despite the company's belief that their security systems was impregnable. Hawkeye, searching for a job after recently parting ways with the Avengers, sensed an opportunity. He broke into the office of K.H. Keeshan, a high-level employee in the company, and asked for a job. Despite being met with anger over his actions, Keeshan hired Hawkeye to uncover the mystery behind the burglaries. Hawkeye soon discovered that the burglaries were being committed by Deathbird, a member of an alien race named the Shi'ar. Hawkeye battled and defeated his powerful foe and gained full employment at C.T.E. as the Head of Security. He later went on to defend the company against Mister Fear.

Hawkeye later helped sabotage a plot by C.T.E. employee Ambrose Connors after an encounter with El Aguila. He also starts a steady relationship with the company's head of public relations, Sheila Danning.

The superhero Mockingbird, working on a lead that C.T.E. is involved in criminal activities, breaks into one of the company's warehouses searching for evidence. She is confronted by Hawkeye, who believes that Mockingbird is an industrial spy. The pair battle, with Mockingbird trying to convince Hawkeye of her intentions, until she is captured by C.T.E. security forces. Hawkeye, sensing that something is not right, later conducts his own investigation into the company. He is then betrayed by Sheila Danning and captured by the C.T.E. security forces and relieved of his duties. Together, Hawkeye and Mockingbird manage to escape and set out to learn the truth behind Cross Technological Enterprises. They discover that Crossfire, cousin to original owner Darren Cross, has gained control of the company and is using it to further his goals of destroying the superhero community. Hawkeye and Mockingbird are able to defeat Crossfire, and get married shortly afterward.

C.T.E. Head of Systems Designs Douglas Arthur Cartland is among a group of scientists brought together to sort through the acquired machines of Bruce Banner. Cartland, accompanied by Beast, meets with Mister Fantastic, Captain America and the Avengers. Later, while secretly attempting to learn about Banner's machines to further his own career, Cartland is attacked by Arnim Zola. He is soon rescued by the gathered superheroes.

Years later, Augustine resurfaces and operates at the Cross Technological Enterprises branch in Florida. He kidnapped Erica Sondheim and brought her to Cross Technological Enterprises where he plans to force Erica into transplanting a new heart into the body of a cryogenically-preserved Darren Cross. When Cassandra Lang was captured by Crossfire when Augustine believed that her Pym Particle-irradiated heart could sustain the condition of Darren's body, Scott Lang, Grizzly, and Machinesmith worked to rescue her. During the rescue mission, Scott Lang ended up encountering a resurrected Darren Cross.

After Darren Cross refused to invest in Power Broker's Hench App, Augustine Cross temporarily hired Machinesmith to hack into Power Broker Inc.'s database so that they can steal the algorithm for Cross Technological Enterprises and make their knock-off of the Hench App called "Lackey."<ref>Astonishing Ant-Man #1</ref>

In order to better combat Ant-Man, Darren Cross hires Egghead to work for Cross Technological Enterprises. Egghead creates for him the Yellowjacket armor to help him control his abilities.

Staff
 Darren Agonistes Cross - Founder and CEO
 Augustine Cross - CEO
 Ambrose Connors - Special Project Director
 K.H. Keeshan - 
 Sheila Danning - Head of Public Relations
 Douglas Arthur Cartland - Head of Systems Design
 Ronald English - 
 Jorge Latham - 
 Egghead -

Former staff
 Hawkeye - Head of Security
 Sonny Burch - Former Chairman

Technology
 Darren Cross' nucleorganic pacemaker
 Hawkeye's Sky-Cycle (created by Jorge Latham)
 Silencer's sound nullifying uniform
 Crossfire's undertaker machine
 Ronald English's nucleonic radiator

In other media
Cross Technologies appears in the Marvel Cinematic Universe film Ant-Man''. This version, known as Pym Technologies, was a multinational technology and scientific research company founded by Hank Pym, following his departure from S.H.I.E.L.D., to study quantum mechanics. But he was later voted out of his own company by his protege Darren Cross and his daughter, Hope van Dyne. Obsessed with recreating the fabled Pym Particles, Cross eventually succeeded and created the Yellowjacket suit, hoping to sell it to the military and terrorist organizations and planning to rename the company in his name, Cross Technologies. He is ultimately stopped by Pym, van Dyne, and Scott Lang, and the company's headquarters is destroyed.

See also
 Alchemax
 Oscorp
 Parker Industries
 Roxxon Energy Corporation
 Stark Industries

References

External links
 Ambrose Connors at the Appendix to the Handbook of the Marvel Universe
 Sheila Danning at the Appendix to the Handbook of the Marvel Universe
 Atom-Smasher (Ronald English) at the Appendix to the Handbook of the Marvel Universe
 Douglas Arthur Cartland at the Appendix to the Handbook of the Marvel Universe
 Mister Keeshan at the Appendix to the Handbook of the Marvel Universe

Fictional companies